Cerophagopsis is a genus of mites in the family Acaridae.

Species
 Cerophagopsis indicus (Potter & Olsen, 1987)
 Cerophagopsis skorikovi Zachvatkin, 1941

References

Acaridae